The 2022 South American Trampoline Championships were held in Bucaramanga, Colombia, from September 5 to 12, 2022. The competition was organized by the Colombian Gymnastics Federation and approved by the International Gymnastics Federation.

Medalists

References

2022 in gymnastics
Trampoline,2022
International gymnastics competitions hosted by Colombia
2022 in Colombian sport
September 2022 sports events in South America